Gonda is a rural locality (a selo) and the administrative centre of Ulkhaaskoye Rural Settlement, Yeravninsky District, Republic of Buryatia, Russia. The population was 507 as of 2017. There are 9 streets.

Geography 
Gonda is located 23 km west of Sosnovo-Ozerskoye (the district's administrative centre) by road. Ukyr is the nearest rural locality.

References 

Rural localities in Yeravninsky District